The Positively True Adventures of the Alleged Texas Cheerleader-Murdering Mom is a 1993 biographical black comedy television film produced by and for HBO. It was directed by Michael Ritchie and starred Holly Hunter, Swoosie Kurtz and Beau Bridges.

It is based on the true story of Wanda Holloway, a woman who tried to put out a hit on one of her daughter's classmates (and the girl's mother) to advance her own daughter's Middle school cheerleading career.

Plot
When Wanda Holloway was a teen, her father forbade her from trying out for her school's cheerleading team. Many years later, when Wanda had a daughter of her own, she was determined that her daughter would fulfill the dream she was denied and become a cheerleader—which would allow Wanda to make up that part of her childhood by reliving it through her daughter. The film takes place in Channelview, Texas.

Wanda enrolls her daughter, Shanna, in various dance and gymnastics classes in order to enhance her prospects of becoming a cheerleader. She forces Shanna to practice for hours on end, despite sickness or injury. Wanda's best friend, Verna Heath, and her daughter, Amber, live next door to the Holloway family. Amber is the same age as Shanna and the two teenagers become friends. Verna had been a successful varsity twirler when she was young and holds the same ambition as Wanda for her own daughter.

Leading up to the cheerleading tryouts, jealousy sparks between Wanda and Verna, despite the fact that their daughters' friendship remains solid. In the months prior to the tryouts, Wanda forces Shanna to concentrate completely on cheer-leading. At the tryouts, Amber impresses the judges but Shanna is unable to, despite all of her training. Amber makes the squad and Shanna does not, disappointing both Shanna and Wanda. The fact that Shanna did not make it onto the team causes Wanda to end the friendship between Shanna and Amber. Wanda does not give up on seeing her daughter become a cheerleader, and decides to try again next year.

Every day until next year's tryouts, Shanna practices frequently at her mother's command. When the time arrives, Amber makes the team and is even promoted to co-captain, but Shanna is disqualified because of her mother's attempts to bribe the judges and other students. The shock of her daughter's failure for the second time puts Wanda into a mad fit of rage, anger and jealousy. Wanda decides that if it wasn't for Amber, Shanna would have definitely been a cheerleader. She becomes obsessed with the notion that living next door to talented Amber had sapped Shanna's confidence and ruined her chances of success.

Wanda meets her brother-in-law Terry to take a hit out on Amber and Verna. Terry is horrified by Wanda's hate for a thirteen-year-old girl, and disagrees with the murder of a young vibrant girl—especially over something as petty as cheerleading. After the rendezvous, Terry decides to turn Wanda in to the police. He meets Wanda again, this time with a tape recorder in order to obtain proof of Wanda's desire to commit homicide. Terry sends the recorded message, along with background information, to the police. Wanda is arrested and sentenced to fifteen years in prison, but is set free when it is discovered that a member of the jury at her trial was on probation. Wanda serves only six months for the attempted murder of Amber.

In the end, Shanna decides it would be best to quit trying out for the cheerleading team. Presently, Shanna and Wanda reside in California, where Shanna is taking classes in modelling, singing and acting. Wanda hopes that one day, her daughter will be a famous Hollywood actress, no matter what it takes.

Reception
Reception for the film was positive. Entertainment Weekly praising the film stating "the movie gets its real kick when it comes time for everyone to sell their rights to Hollywood... with one writer remarking she has 'Holly Hunter' in mind for the lead." However, People magazine's review stated that the movie "has two good performances" but that it "just doesn't seem to have much point." Roger Ebert recommended the film as Video of the Week on At the Movies.

Television critic Matt Zoller Seitz in his 2016 book co-written with Alan Sepinwall titled TV (The Book) named the film as the 2nd greatest American TV-movie of all time, behind Steven Spielberg's Duel. He stated that "this is a serio-comic (emphasis on serio-) account of a real and bizarre crime, but also a satire on media ethics and the entertainment industry's insatiable tendency to turn real people's pain into entertainment.... The film is self aware from start to finish ... yet it never loses track of the pathetic and tragic aspects of the story, and it never condescends to its small-town characters".

Accolades
Holly Hunter won the Emmy Award for Best Actress in a TV Movie for playing Wanda Holloway and Beau Bridges won both the Emmy and the Golden Globe Awards for Supporting Actor in a TV Movie for his portrayal of Terry Harper, Holloway's brother-in-law whom she contacted to arrange the hit.

References

External links
 
 
 

1990s crime comedy films
1993 television films
1993 films
American black comedy films
American crime comedy films
Biographical films about criminals
Cheerleading films
Comedy films based on actual events
Films directed by Michael Ritchie
Films set in 1991
Films set in Texas
Films shot in Texas
Harris County, Texas
HBO Films films
Crime films based on actual events
Films with screenplays by Jane Anderson
1990s English-language films
1990s American films